Sorbus anglica, the English whitebeam, is a species of whitebeam tree in the family Rosaceae. It is uncommonly found in Ireland and the United Kingdom, with an entire British population estimated at about 600 individuals.

Description
Sorbus anglica grows as a small tree or shrub, often with multiple stems. The leaves are broader than most other Sorbus, with lobes whose bases are incised up to one third of the way to the midrib.

Distribution
Sorbus anglica is found in several widely scattered sites in south-west England, Wales, and around Killarney in south-west Ireland.

Ecology and evolution
Sorbus anglica is usually found growing on cliffs, quarries and rocky hillsides.  It appears to be indifferent to soil pH. Occasional specimens are known from oak woodland.  Research suggests Sorbus anglica arose from a cross between Sorbus porrigentiformis and Sorbus aucuparia.

References

anglica
Taxonomy articles created by Polbot
Trees of the United Kingdom
Trees of Ireland